The Scout and Guide movement in Greece is served by
 the Scouts of Greece, member of the World Organization of the Scout Movement
 Soma Hellinidon Odigon, member of the World Association of Girl Guides and Girl Scouts

See also